Kostyantyn Vasyukov (born 10 January 1981) is a retired Ukrainian athlete specialising in the sprinting events. He won the bronze medal in the 60 metres at the 2005 European Indoor Championships.

Competition record

Personal bests
Outdoor
100 metres – 10.22 (+1.3 m/s) (Kiev 2006)
200 metres – 21.32 (Kiev 2000)
Indoor
50 metres – 5.84 (Groningen 2005)
60 metres – 6.61 (Zaporizhia 2004)

References

1981 births
Living people
Ukrainian male sprinters
Competitors at the 2005 Summer Universiade